William Brandon Glover (April 22, 1938) was Virginia Tech's first All-American wrestler.  He won all 26 of his dual meet matches during his four-year wrestling career. 17 of these wins came on falls.

Glover earned All-America honors in his sophomore year of 1959 when he was invited to participate in the NCAA championship in the 130 pound class.  He lost his only career match in the semi-finals of the event, but came back to score a victory in the third-place match.

The product of Granby High School in Norfolk, VA was Southern Conference champion all four season and led Virginia Tech team in scoring three of his four years.  He was team captain his senior year. He was inducted into the Virginia Tech Sports Hall of Fame in 1988 as the first wrestler so honored.

References

1938 births
American male sport wrestlers
Virginia Tech Hokies wrestlers
Living people
People from Norfolk, Virginia